Kamil Matuszny (born 25 November 1974) is a former football player from the Czech Republic. He belongs to the Polish minority in the Czech Republic.

Matuszny played most of his career for Bohemians 1905, going on loan on several occasions. He ended his professional career in 2005.

References

External links
 
 Profile at Bohemians 1905 website

Czech footballers
1974 births
Living people
Czech First League players
Polish people from Zaolzie
Association football defenders
Bohemians 1905 players
FK Fotbal Třinec players
FC Slovan Liberec players
FK Čáslav players